Georgi Minchev (9 April 1943 – 18 February 2001), also called Gosho Minchev or Zhoro Minchev, was a Bulgarian rock musician, singer, songwriter and TV presenter.

He is best known as one of the pioneers of the rock music genre in Bulgaria as well as one of the advocates of the restoration of the democracy in the country. Many of his songs became classic rock hits most notably White Silence, Blessed years, The Bulgarian Rock, Balance, The Song of the singer, Alone at the Bar, A Story with Guitar and Almost Midnight.

During the 1990s, he was a co-founder of the supergroup Stari Mutsuni (Old faces) which featured also Petar Gyuzelev and Georgi Markov of Shturtsite and Ivaylo Kraychovski and Ivan Lechev of FSB.

After his death in 2001, the rock music festival "Flower for Gosho" was established in his honor. It takes place in Sofia during the summer.

Discography

Studio albums
 BG Rock / (Българският рок) (1987)
 Rock'n'Roll Veterans / (Рокенрол ветерани) (1989)
 Alone at the bar / (Сам на бара) (1994)
 Balance / (Равносметка) (1995)
 White Silence / (Бяла тишина) (1997)
 A Story with Guitar / (История с китара) (1999)
 The World of Tomorrow / (Le Monde De Demain) (2000)

References

Sources

External links
 Web page dedicated to Georgi Minchev
 Photos of Georgi Minchev
 Rock legend Georgi Minchev

Bulgarian rock musicians
Bulgarian rock singers
Musicians from Sofia
1943 births
2001 deaths
Bulgarian singer-songwriters
20th-century Bulgarian male singers
University of National and World Economy alumni